Starokurmashevo (İśke Qormaş) is a rural locality (a selo) and the administrative centre of Starokurmashevsky Selsoviet, Kushnarenkovsky District, Bashkortostan, Russia. The population was 646 as of 2010. There are 9 streets.

Geography 
Starokurmashevo is located 5 km southwest of Kushnarenkovo (the district's administrative centre) by road. Kushnarenkovo is the nearest rural locality.

References 

Rural localities in Kushnarenkovsky District